Kammal is an Indian television soap opera which debut in 2002 on Zee TV. The story is based on the life of Kammal, a woman of substance. The series was produced under Balaji Telefilms.

Plot
The story portrays the life of a young girl, Kammal (Keerti Gaekwad Kelkar), who is brought up by three bar dancers. These women, against tremendous odds, raise Kammal to be a woman of immense grace and beauty. The story takes a major twist, when a rich guy (played by Sandeep Baswana) from a well-known family falls in love with Kammal. Despite his family being against this marriage proposal, he  marries Kammal. What follows is a gut-wrenching drama of love, deception, faith and betrayal. At every step of her life, Kammal is put to test by her own loved ones to prove her integrity, and yet every time she proves to be innocent and loyal.

Cast
 Ronit Roy as Swayam Jajoo
 Sandeep Baswana as Manav Jajoo
 Keerti Gaekwad Kelkar as Kammal Manav Jajoo
 Ashlesha Sawant as Anita Bhatia / Anita Manav Jajoo
 Pratima Kazmi as Ramabai
 Amita Chandekar as Tripti Swayam Jajoo
 Moonmoon Banerjee as Shaina Bose 
 Neena Kulkarni as Raina Bose / Rini Sanyal
 Abir Goswami as Satya Jajoo
 Jaya Bhattacharya as Debu Jayantilal Jajoo
 Zahida Parveen as Shabbo
 Richa Nayyar as Rita
 Prashant Bhatt as Yash Jajoo
 Kali Prasad Mukherjee as Jayantilal Jajoo
 Dolly Sohi as Manya Jajoo
 Rajendra Chawla as Narayan Jajoo
 Pratap Sachdev as Viraj's Father
 Sachin Shroff as Viraj 
 Zarina Wahab as Raina Bose / Rini Sanyal
 Amit Varma as Sameer Bose
 Kamya Panjabi as Vidisha 
 Kavita Kaushik as Rushali 
 Kishwer Merchant as Nisha Yash Jajoo
 Manish Khanna as Mr. Bhatia
 Alka Kaushal

References

Balaji Telefilms television series
Indian television soap operas
Zee TV original programming
2002 Indian television series debuts
2003 Indian television series endings